Gianluca Luppi (born 23 August 1966) is an Italian professional football coach and a former player, who played as a defender.

1966 births
Living people
People from Crevalcore
Italian footballers
Serie A players
Serie B players
Bologna F.C. 1909 players
Juventus F.C. players
ACF Fiorentina players
Atalanta B.C. players
Ravenna F.C. players
Venezia F.C. players
S.S.C. Napoli players
A.C. Cesena players
Venezia F.C. managers
Italian football managers
Association football defenders
A.S.D. Mezzolara managers
Footballers from Emilia-Romagna
Sportspeople from the Metropolitan City of Bologna